Ruediger Dahlke (born 24 July 1951 in East Berlin) is best known for the many books and articles on health issues, translated into more than 20 languages. His work centers on psychosomatics, spiritual philosophy, nutrition and esoteric.

Life and background 
Dahlke went to school in Freising, and became a Physician with his dissertation on the psychosomatics of childhood bronchial asthma (1978) at the Ludwig Maximilian University of Munich.

He continued with further studies and specialised in naturopathic medicine and various types of psychotherapy. This was followed by a long collaboration with Thorwald Dethlefsen.

He went his own ways by setting up a medical center in Johanneskirchen with his first wife Margit Dahlke in 1990, that is still active till today.

In 2010-2012 followed the purchase, build-up and start of a health centre Tamanga in Gamlitz, a place in Styria, Austria.

His approach belongs to the alternative medicine, challenging the traditional, evidence-based medicine and therefore he has attracted criticism.

In 2020 and 2021 Dahlke became a source of misinformation about the COVID-19 pandemic, and he propagated ways of overcoming the risk factors and strengthening the immune system, as set out in the books "Protection against Infections", "Corona as a Wake-up Call" and "Mind-Food".

He currently runs his health centre Tamanga, where he gives a variety of seminars on fasting, "connected breathing" and "integral medicine", and offering workshops on various topics promoting health Clemens G. Arvay.

Books 
 The Healing Power of Illness  Krankheit als Weg, Sentient Publications, 
 Mandalas of the World - a meditation and paintings Guide  Mandalas der Welt - Sterling Publishing Co. 1992, New York, N.Y. 10016
 Heart-Aches - Heart Disease and the Psychology of the Broken Heart  Herz(ens)prpobleme - Bluestar Communications Corporation, 1996
 Krankheit als Sprache der Seele  Bluestar Communications Woodside, California
 Everyday Initiations  Lebenskrisen als Entwicklungschancen - Bluestar Communications Corporation, 1999
 Der Mensch und die Welt sind eins
 Mandalas for Meditation  Arbeitsbuch zur Mandala-Therapie, Sterling Publishing, 2001
 Disease as a symbol  Krankheit als Symbol - M-tec Verlag von Buengner
 Peace food, wie der Verzicht auf Fleisch Körper und Seele heilt, 2020

References

1951 births
Living people
People from East Berlin
People in alternative medicine
Ludwig Maximilian University of Munich alumni